Ilex cowanii is a species of plant in the family Aquifoliaceae. It is endemic to Venezuela. The species was named after Adeline May Cowan.

References

cowanii
Endemic flora of Venezuela
Vulnerable flora of South America
Taxonomy articles created by Polbot